This is an archive for the notable records of the Premier Volleyball League since its formation in 2017. The following records does not include the records held during the time of the Shakey's V-League (2004-2016).

Notable records

As a team
The Creamline Cool Smashers is a record-setting team in the league having the most championships with 5 titles (1 reinforced, 3 open, 1 invitational).
The Petro Gazz Angels is the first and only team who won more than one Reinforced conference titles (2019, 2022).
The Creamline Cool Smashers has the most active team in the league, debuting in 2017 and never missing a conference (excluding Collegiate Conference). Creamline and the Petro Gazz Angels are the two longest-active teams in the league, with Petro Gazz also having no record of skipping a conference since their 2018 debut.
The Creamline Cool Smashers has the most finals appearances in the league with six. Starting from 2018 to 2022, they also hold the longest streak of finals appearances.
The Creamline Cool Smashers is the team with the most Final Four appearances. Their ten appearances make them the only team who has never left the Final Four. They are followed by the Petro Gazz Angels with five appearances, and the Perlas Spikers with four.
The Creamline Cool Smashers is the first and only professional club team who have achieved an immaculate record (undefeated) in a conference. They achieved this two times (2019 Open, 2022 Open).
The NU Lady Bulldogs is the only collegiate team who achieved an immaculate record (an undefeated record) in a collegiate conference (2017 Collegiate).
The Creamline-Petro Gazz championship is the most recurring championship match-up in the league that happened three times (2019 Reinforced, 2019 Open, 2022 Open).
The Chef's Classics Lady Red Spikers and the TIP Lady Engineers are the only teams who have not tallied a single win in a conference.

As a player
Alyssa Valdez is the most awarded and most decorated player in the entire league, having won eleven awards. She is followed by Jia Morado-De Guzman with ten, Myla Pablo with seven, and Tots Carlos with five awards.
Alyssa Valdez is the player with the most MVP awards, having four MVP titles (3 Conference MVPs, 1 Finals MVP). Jia Morado-De Guzman, Myla Pablo, and Jaja Santiago are tied for the second most MVP titles with three awarded to both of them.
Alyssa Valdez is the player with the most Conference MVP awards, meanwhile Jia Morado-De Guzman is the player with the most Finals MVP awards. Both of them have three awards each.
Myla Pablo is the first and only player who earned an MVP award three consecutive times (excluding Collegiate Conference). She first achieved a Finals MVP award in the 2017 Reinforced, followed by two Conference MVP titles in 2017 Open, and 2018 Reinforced.
Isa Molde and Jaja Santiago are the only players who achieved both Conference and Finals MVP in one conference. Molde was first to achieve this feat in the 2018 Collegiate, while Santiago achieved this during the 2021 Open.
Alyssa Valdez is the player with the most "Best Outside Spiker" awards, earning seven in her time. She is followed by Myla Pablo and Gretchel Soltones who have four and three, respectively.
Jeanette Panaga is the player with the most "Best Middle Blocker" awards, earning four in her career. Kathy Bersola, Risa Sato, Ria Meneses, and Roselyn Doria are tied for second with each of them earning three awards.
Tots Carlos is the player with the most "Best Opposite Spiker" awards, having earned three of this award. Following her is Kat Tolentino with two awards.
Jia Morado-De Guzman holds the record of having the most number of "Best Setter" awards with seven of them to her name. She is the only player who has more than one "Best Setter" award in the league.
Melissa Gohing-Nacino is the player who earned the most "Best Libero" awards, earning two in her time playing.

Match statistic records

Match records
The match between BanKo Perlas Spikers and Power Smashers holds the record for having the most points scored in a match with 242 points. It happened during the 2017 Premier Volleyball League Reinforced Conference with the following set scores: 29–31, 24–26, 25–19, 25–23, 21–19. 
The most lopsided match is between the Creamline Cool Smashers and Adamson Lady Falcons during the 2018 Premier Volleyball League Open Conference with a set score of 25–7, 25–11, 25–10, for a total of 103 points. It is also the shortest match in the league, lasting 1 hour and 2 minutes.
The most contested set belongs to the match between the PacificTown-Army Lady Troopers and Choco Mucho Flying Titans during the 2019 Open where the set score reached to 39–41 in the first set. Choco Mucho won the grueling set, but PacificTown-Army got the match win.
The match between the BaliPure Purest Water Defenders and the Creamline Cool Smashers holds the record for the most lopsided set in the league. With a set score of 3–25 during the 2021 Premier Volleyball League Open Conference, this makes it the only set played in the league that a team has only won less than five points. Creamline won the set and the match via sweep.
The match between the Petro Gazz Angels and the PLDT High Speed Hitters in the 2022 Premier Volleyball League Reinforced Conference is the longest match with a duration of 2 hours and 50 minutes. Despite being only a 4-setter game, the game took a long time due to a controversial delay with the challenge system during the tail-end of the fourth set, lasting the set an hour and 12 minutes. That crucial system error resulted in Petro Gazz winning the game and handing PLDT their fourth consecutive loss in the conference. Despite that, PLDT can push a protest in writing one hour after the match to make it official as they did not sign the scoresheet.

Player records
Prisilla Rivera holds the record for the most points scored in a single game. With a whopping 44 points (39 attacks, 1 block, 4 aces), she led Akari Power Chargers to a 5-set win against Choco Mucho Flying Titans in the 2022 Premier Volleyball League Reinforced Conference.
Alyssa Valdez is the local player who scored the most points in a single match. She scored 37 points (34 attacks, 1 block, 2 aces) in a 4-setter win against BaliPure Purest Water Defenders during the 2017 Premier Volleyball League Open Conference.
BanKo Perlas Spikers' import, Lakia Jamiah Bright, holds the record for the most spikes in a single match as she led the team with 40 spikes against the PayMaya Highflyers during the Game 3 of 2018 Reinforced Conference semifinals.
Ria Meneses is the player who tallied the most blocks in a single match. She scored a whopping 10 blocks in a 3-setter win against Perlas Spikers during the 2021 Premier Volleyball League Open Conference.
Alyssa Valdez tallies the most aces in a match, scoring 8 aces against the Tacloban Fighting Warays in the 2018 Premier Volleyball League Reinforced Conference.
Jia Morado-De Guzman holds the record for the most excellent sets in a match, tallying 71 excellent sets in a win against the BaliPure Purest Water Defenders during the 2017 Premier Volleyball League Open Conference.

Here is the table of the scoring records in the PVL for all-time, imports, and locals:

Notable head-to-head

BaliPure Purest Water Defenders vs. Pocari Sweat Lady Warriors

Creamline Cool Smashers vs. Petro Gazz Angels

Chery Tiggo Crossovers vs. Creamline Cool Smashers

Cignal HD Spikers vs. Petro Gazz Angels

References

Premier Volleyball League